Hezlep W. "Heze" Clark (July 22, 1882 – August 31, 1956) was an American college football player and coach. He served two stints as the head football coach at Rose-Hulman Institute of Technology (then known as Rose Polytechnic Institute), from 1908 to 1911 and later from 1923 to 1927.

References

External links
 

1882 births
1956 deaths
American football halfbacks
Basketball coaches from Michigan
Indiana Hoosiers football players
Rose–Hulman Fightin' Engineers athletic directors
Rose–Hulman Fightin' Engineers football coaches
Rose–Hulman Fightin' Engineers men's basketball coaches
People from Huron County, Michigan